John Frederik Mikaelsson (6 December 1913 – 16 June 1987) was a Swedish race walker who set 14 European and world records in various events. He was most successful over 10 km distance, winning Olympic gold medals in 1948 and 1952 and a European title in 1946.

Mikaelsson competed domestically in running, skiing, orienteering, handball and football. His international race walking career began with a win at the 1937 English championship, but was then interrupted by World War II.

References

1913 births
1987 deaths
Swedish male racewalkers
Olympic gold medalists for Sweden
Athletes (track and field) at the 1948 Summer Olympics
Athletes (track and field) at the 1952 Summer Olympics
Olympic athletes of Sweden
World record setters in athletics (track and field)
European Athletics Championships medalists
Medalists at the 1952 Summer Olympics
Medalists at the 1948 Summer Olympics
Olympic gold medalists in athletics (track and field)
20th-century Swedish people